Donna Marie Kennedy-Glans (born May 5, 1960) is a Canadian politician who was elected to the Legislative Assembly of Alberta representing the electoral district of Calgary-Varsity from April 2012 to May 2015. She was elected initially as a member of the Progressive Conservative caucus, and chaired the all-party Standing Committee on Resource Stewardship.  On December 13, 2013, she was sworn into the Cabinet of Alberta to fill the newly created post of Associate Minister – Electricity and Renewable Energy.

On October 25, 2012, Kennedy-Glans was one of eight PC MLA and cabinet members who accompanied then Premier Allison Redford on a flight in a government fleet aircraft to attend a PC party fundraiser in Grande Prairie on October 25, 2012. In his 2014 report, then provincial Auditor General Merwan Saher found Redford's use of government fleet aircraft for partisan purposes to be inappropriate.

Kennedy-Glans announced that she was resigning from cabinet and leaving the PC caucus to sit as an independent on March 17, 2014, in protest against the leadership of Alison Redford. She officially rejoined the PC caucus on September 17, 2014, after Jim Prentice assumed the leadership of the party.

Kennedy-Glans declared as a candidate for the leadership of the Alberta Progressive Conservative Party. She withdrew her candidacy in a letter to supporters on November 8, 2016, following the party's Annual General Meeting, saying: "Right now, politics in Alberta is polarizing and there is limited opportunity for centrist voices to be heard." Following Jason Kenney's Progressive Conservative leadership victory Kennedy-Glans announced, that 10 days prior to the vote, she had been named to his transition team.

Election results

References

External links
Donna Kennedy-Glans

1960 births
Living people
Progressive Conservative Association of Alberta MLAs
Women MLAs in Alberta
21st-century Canadian politicians
21st-century Canadian women politicians